Mulk may refer to:
 Malik or Mulk, a Semitic term translating to "king"
 Mulk, Iran (disambiguation)
 Mulk (TV series), a 2003 Indian television drama series
 Mulk (film), a 2018 Indian Hindi-language drama film
 Mülk, a form of land tenure under the Ottoman Empire